The Hitda Codex is an eleventh-century codex containing an evangeliary, a selection of passages from the Gospels, commissioned by Hitda, abbess of Meschede in about 1020. It is held at University and State Library Darmstadt. Hitda is depicted in the book's dedication miniature presenting the codex to the convent's patron, St Walburga.

The illuminations are highlights of the Cologne school in the later phases of the Ottonian Renaissance. The Hitda Codex contains the only surviving  Life of Christ cycle of illuminations produced in Cologne from this period. The cycle's cultural context has been replicated by Henry Mayr-Harting.

Gallery

Notes

Christian illuminated manuscripts
11th-century illuminated manuscripts
Ottonian illuminated manuscripts